Basilisk is a rural locality in the Cassowary Coast Region, Queensland, Australia. In the  Basilisk had a population of 0 people.

Geography 
The locality is almost entirely composed of the Basilisk Range which rises from land close to sea level at the east to a series of unnamed peaks of from 200 to 400 metres. The central and southern area of the locality forms the Basilisk Range National Park. While the northern part of the locality is freehold land, it has not generally been cleared. There are only a few small pockets of land at the foot of the range used for farming.

History 
The name Basilisk was the original name of the nearby town South Johnstone until 1954.

In the  Basilisk had a population of 0 people.

References 

Cassowary Coast Region
Localities in Queensland